George Washington Badgerow (May 24, 1841 – July 31, 1892) was an Ontario lawyer and political figure. He represented York East in the Legislative Assembly of Ontario from 1879 to 1886 as a Liberal member.

He was born in Markham Township, Upper Canada in 1841, the son of Martin Badgerow, who had come to Markham from New York state. Badgerow taught school, then studied law and was called to the Ontario bar in 1871. He set up practice in Toronto. In 1867, he married Rachel Mulholland. He was named Crown Attorney for the city of Toronto and York County in 1887. Badgerow was chosen as Supreme Master Workman of the Ancient Order of United Workmen in 1886.

References

External links 
 The Canadian biographical dictionary and portrait gallery of eminent and self-made men ... (1880)
 
 Toronto, old and new : a memorial volume ..., GM Adam (1891)
 The Township of Scarboro, 1796-1896, D Boyle (1896)

1841 births
1892 deaths
19th-century Canadian politicians
Ontario Liberal Party MPPs
People from Markham, Ontario